The 2016–17 Virginia Cavaliers women's basketball team will represent the University of Virginia during the 2016–17 NCAA Division I women's basketball season. The Cavaliers, led by sixth year head coach Joanne Boyle, they played their home games at John Paul Jones Arena and are members the Atlantic Coast Conference. They finished the season 20–13, 7–9 in ACC play to finish in eighth place. They advanced in the quarterfinals of the ACC women's tournament where they lost to Notre Dame. They were invited to the Women's National Invitation Tournament where they defeated Saint Joseph's first round before losing to James Madison in the second round.

2016–17 media

Virginia Cavaliers Sports Network
The Virginia Cavaliers Sports Network will broadcast select Cavaliers games on WINA. John Freeman, Larry Johnson, and Myron Ripley will provide the call for the games. Games not broadcast on WINA can be listened to online through Cavaliers Live at virginiasports.com.

Roster

Schedule

|-
!colspan=9 style="background:#00214E; color:#F56D22;"|Non-conference regular season

|-
!colspan=9 style="background:#00214E; color:#F56D22;"|Conference regular season

|-
!colspan=9 style="background:#00214E; color:#F56D22;"| ACC Women's Tournament

|-
!colspan=9 style="background:#00214E; color:#F56D22;"| WNIT

Rankings

See also
 2016–17 Virginia Cavaliers men's basketball team

References

Virginia Cavaliers women's basketball seasons
Virginia
2017 Women's National Invitation Tournament participants
Virginia Cavaliers women's basketball
Virginia Cavaliers women's basketball